Khurshīd Ahmad (b. 23 March 1932) , is a Pakistani economist, philosopher, politician, and an Islamic activist who helped to develop Islamic economic jurisprudence as an academic discipline and one of the co-founders (along with Khurram Murad) of The Islamic Foundation in Leicester, UK.

A senior conservative figure, he has been long-standing party worker of the Islamist Jamaat-e-Islami (JeI) party, where he successfully ran for Senate in the general elections held in 2002 on a platform of Muttahida Majlis-e-Amal (MMA). He served in the Senate until 2012. He played his role as a policy adviser in Zia administration when he chaired the Planning Commission, focusing on the role of Islamising the country's national economy in the 1980s.

Biography

Family, education, and early life
Ahmad was born into an Urdu-speaking family in Delhi, British India, on 23 March 1932. He entered in the Anglo-Arabic College in Delhi. After the partition of India in 1947, the family moved to Pakistan and were settled in Lahore, Punjab, after which, he enrolled at the Government College University to study business and economic in 1949. In 1949, Ahmad published his first English article in the Muslim Economist.

He secured his graduation in BA in first-class honours in Economics 1952. He began reading the philosophical work of Abul A'la Maududi and was a worker of his party, the Jamaat-e-Islami (JeI). In 1952, he took the Bar exam and entered in law program of the GCU with strong emphasis on Islamic law and jurisprudence. At his university, he remained student worker for the JeI while offering tutoring in Islamic studies. As an aftermath of violent riots in Lahore, Ahmad left the GCU to avoid the massive arrest and detainment of the JeI workers by the Punjab Police Department, and moved to Karachi permanently.

Khurshid Ahmad enrolled in the Karachi University and graduated with MSc with Hons in Economics after defending his thesis that contained the fundamental work of Adam Smith on Invisible hand and the Capitalism in 1958.

In 1962, Khurshid Ahmad graduated with an MA with Hons in Islamic studies from the University of Karachi and won a scholarship to pursue a doctoral degree in the United Kingdom in 1965. Ahmad enrolled at the University of Leicester and joined the Faculty of Economics for his doctoral studies. He successfully defended his doctoral thesis for his PhD in Economics in 1967–68. His doctoral thesis was on Islamic economic jurisprudence. In 1970, his services to promote literacy was recognized by Leicester University, which honored him with an honorary doctorate in Education. In 1970, he moved to England and joined the department of philosophy to teach Contemporary philosophy at the Leicester University.

Awards and recognition 
In recognition of his scholarly contributions, Khurshid Ahmad was awarded Pakistan’s highest civil award, the Nishan-e-Imtiaz on 23 March 2011.
He received the King Faisal Award for Service to Islam in 1990 (Co-laureate: Ali Al Tantawi)

See also 
Naeem Siddiqui 
 Islami Jamiat-e-Talaba
 Jamaat-e-Islami Pakistan
 Muttahida Majlis-e-Amal
 Sayyid Abul Ala Maududi
 Mian Tufail Mohammad
 Abdul Ghafoor Ahmed
 Politics of Pakistan

References

External links 
 Official Jamaat-e-Islami Pakistan website
 Official Jamaat-e-Islami Pakistan Biography of Professor Khurshid Ahmad

1932 births
Living people
People from Delhi
Muhajir people
People from Lahore
Jamaat-e-Islami Pakistan politicians
Government College University, Lahore alumni
Pakistani economists
University of Karachi alumni
Pakistani educators
Pakistani scholars
Pakistani expatriates in the United Kingdom
Alumni of the University of Leicester
Academics of the University of Leicester
Pakistani philosophers
20th-century Muslim scholars of Islam
Recipients of Nishan-e-Imtiaz
Islamic scholars in the United Kingdom